High Plains Doctor: Healing on the Tibetan Plateau is a 2012 documentary film by Michael Dayan, who produced, directed, and shot the film. Premiering on the documentary channel in Canada, it focuses on documenting the life journey of Isaac Sobol, who recounts his professional experiences and personal insights as Chief Medical Officer of Nunavut and professor of Aboriginal People's Health.

High Plains Doctor was shot in the village of Yushu, which was leveled in an earthquake shortly after filming. The film is the only known moving picture documentation of the town before its destruction, providing a rare document into a way of life that is disappearing. The film documents Sobol's tenth and final medical mission to Yushu.

Locations
Yushu, Tibet
Iqaluit, Nunavut, Canada

Releases
The Canadian premiere was on CBC television's documentary channel on May 7, 2012. The first charity (or fundraiser) pre-release screening was at the Park Theatre in Vancouver BC Canada on April 15, 2012.
The United States premiere will be at the 2013 Santa Barbara International Film Festival January 24 - February 3, 2013. The film is entered in the Social Justice Competition.

References

External links
High Plains Doctor on the CBC Documentary Channel

Helliwell Pictures
Official Facebook Page
High Plains Doctor on DOCspace

2012 films
Documentary films about Tibet
Documentary films about health care
Canadian documentary television films
2010s English-language films
2010s Canadian films